Gurdon Wallace Wattles (May 12, 1855 - January 31, 1932) was an early businessman, banker, and civic leader in Omaha, Nebraska, who became responsible for bankrolling much of early Hollywood. Wattles was said to possess "all the right credentials to direct Omaha's fortunes for the twentieth century in the post-pioneer era: humble beginnings, outstanding ability, a fine intellect, impeccable manners, driving ambition, and a ruthless streak."

Personal life
Gurdon Wallace Wattles was the third son of James Wattles and Elizabeth Whitton. He was born on May 12, 1855, in the town of Richford, New York, and died on January 31, 1932, in Hollywood, California. He was the grandson of Dr. Tower Whitton, a 1796 graduate of Dartmouth College.

His first name, Gurdon, was derived from his ancestor Brampton Gurdon, who was a member of Parliament for Sudbury (1621) and high sheriff of Suffolk. His daughter, Muriel Gurdon, married Richard Saltonstall Jr., the son of Sir Richard Saltonstall Sr., who led a group of English settlers up the Charles River to settle in what is now Watertown, Massachusetts, in 1630.

He was a descendant of Mayflower passengers Elder William Brewster and John Howland. He was also a descendant of John Lothropp, an English Anglican clergyman who became a Congregationalist minister and emigrant to New England. He was the founder of Barnstable, Massachusetts, and John Mason, an English army major, a deputy governor of Connecticut, and the principle founder of Norwich, Connecticut. One of his distant relatives from his father's side is Edward Everett, an American politician and president of Harvard University.

Gurdon's father served as a lieutenant in the 109th New York Volunteer Infantry Regiment during the War of the Rebellion, and after the war, he decided to move the family. They traveled in a covered wagon settling in Glidden, Iowa, in 1868. Gurdon graduated from high school there, and soon after become a teacher. He attended Iowa State University graduating in 1876, joining the Delta Tau Delta fraternity and the debate team.

He married Abigail Jane Leete on October 20, 1882, in Jennie's hometown of Clarksville, Iowa. They met while attending at Iowa Agricultural College. She was the daughter of Allen N. Leete and Abigail Button, and a direct descendant of Governor William Leete, who was governor of the Colony of New Haven from 1661 to 1665 and governor of Connecticut from 1676 to 1683. She was born about 1858 in Clarksville, Iowa, and died on May 25, 1916, at Presbyterian Hospital in Chicago, Illinois. They were the parents of three children: Frederick Leete Wattles, Margaret Elizabeth Wattles, and Mary Louise Wattles.

He remarried at Estes Park, Colorado, on June 26, 1918 to Julia Vance. She was born at Milford, Nebraska, on August 23, 1883, the daughter of Alexander Hamilton Vance. She died in November 1977 in Los Angeles. She studied for three years at Doane College, and was a graduate of both Oberlin College and Columbia College. She was the director of the home economics department at the University of Nebraska when she met Gurdon Wattles. She gave birth to a son, Gurdon Wallace Wattles Jr., on May 5, 1920, at their home in Hollywood.

Career
After graduating from college and joining the bar, Wattles joined a firm in Carroll, Iowa. Soon after, he convinced his parents to move there, and at their behest, he donated a lot to the Trinity Episcopal Church congregation to build an edifice. Wattles first venture into banking happened in 1882 when he worked with silent partners to found the Farmer's Bank in Carroll. By focusing directly on assisting the many German immigrants who wanted to farm in eastern Nebraska during this time the Farmer's Bank "prospered beyond our greatest hopes." After arriving in Omaha in 1892 Wattles became the vice-president of the city's Union National Bank.

By 1901, Wattles consolidated all the independent streetcar lines in Omaha into one company called the Omaha and Council Bluffs Streetcar Company, which later became the Omaha Traction Company. In 1903, he helped organize the Omaha Grain Exchange and the Omaha Business Men's Association, a group vowed to keep labor unions out of Omaha and maintain open shops. In 1905, Wattles became the president, and then the chairman of the board of the United States National Bank of Omaha, serving until 1920. Also in 1905, Wattles was the lead of Nebraska's exhibit at the Louisiana Purchase Exposition in St. Louis, Missouri. It was there that he pioneered the usage of filmed footage for advertising. Wattles was a director of the Chicago Great Western Railroad, and was responsible for the construction of the Omaha landmark Hotel Fontenelle in 1914.

Trans-Mississippi and International Exposition

In 1897, Wattles became the organizer and chairman of the Trans-Mississippi and International Exposition and Indian Congress. His leadership is attributed with bringing over 2.6 million people to Omaha to view the 4,062 exhibits during the four months of the exposition. When President William McKinley visited, Wattles introduced him to the crowd of nearly 100,000 assembled on the plaza. Wattles' expo stretched over a  tract in North Omaha and featured a -long lagoon encircled by 21 classical buildings that featured fine and modern products from around the world. During the grand parade for the expo, Wattles rode alongside William Jennings Bryan, a three-time candidate for president of the United States, who was also a close friend. This event is attributed with launching Wattles' influence across Nebraska and throughout the Midwestern United States.

Politics
Wattles was elected delegate to the Republican National Convention in 1904. There he voted for Theodore Roosevelt for president, and when he became a member of the notification committee from Nebraska, he visited Roosevelt at his home in Oyster Bay, New York. Their friendship lasted until Roosevelt died in 1919. Wattles was appointed the Federal Food Administrator for Nebraska by Herbert Hoover during World War I.

Honors
In an elaborate ceremony, Wattles was crowned King of the Knights of Ak-Sar-Ben in 1905. The Iowa State College awarded him an honorary degree in the 1910s.

Wattles House

Noted Omaha architect Thomas R. Kimball designed the Wattles House in the popular historical revival Chateauesque style. It was built in 1895. Today, the majority of the house retains its historical significance. It has been listed as an Omaha Landmark and is a contributing building in the Gold Coast Historic District, listed on the National Register of Historic Places.  Wattles lived in the residence from 1896 to 1921, when he moved permanently to Hollywood, California.

Wattles Mansion

The Wattles Mansion and Gardens in Los Angeles, California, was built by Gurdon Wattles as a summer home around the start of the 20th century. Today, Jualita, as he called the 49-acre estate, is the last remaining intact mansion from that time period. The mansion was sold to the City of Los Angeles in 1965.

See also
History of Omaha

References

External links
 Wattles, G.W. (1922) Autobiography of Gurdon Wallace Wattles.
 Historic postcard of the Wattles Mansion in Hollywood.

1855 births
1932 deaths
Businesspeople from Omaha, Nebraska
American bankers
People from Hollywood, Los Angeles
Nebraska Republicans
People from Richford, New York